A thicket is a dense stand of trees or shrubs. It may also refer to

 Patent thicket

See also 
 The Thicket (disambiguation)